Mathias Spihler (c. 1640 – February 1691) was a Swedish architect and master builder of German descent.

Biography
Spihler was born at Södermalm in Stockholm, Sweden.

He aided Jean de la Vallée in the design and construction  of Katarina Kyrka (Catherine Church)  as technical superintendent at the church in 1671. Spihler also built the Van der Nootska Palace between 1671 and 1672.

In the latter half of the 17th century, Marshal of the Realm of Sweden Johan Gabriel Stenbock (1640-1705) brought  the Sjööe state in the  parish of Holm in Enköping. Together with  Mathias Spieler  and  architect  Nicodemus Tessin the Elder (1615-1681), Stenbock built Sjöö Castle on his estate. The construction work lasted from 1669 until 1679 resulting in the shape and form in which it is today.  Sjöö Castle Palace with its park is considered one of the most beautiful in Sweden, with its perfect and harmonious proportions.

Spieler was married to Margaret de la Vallée, daughter of Jean de la Vallée. Spieler died in Stockholm. He is buried in Kungsholms kyrka (Ulrika Eleonora Church) which he built in 1672.

References

Swedish architects
1640s births
1691 deaths
Artists from Stockholm
Swedish people of German descent